Viola palustris (marsh violet, or alpine marsh violet) is a perennial forb of the genus Viola. It inhabits moist meadows, marshes, and stream banks in northern parts of North America and Eurasia. The species epithet palustris is Latin for "of the marsh" and indicates its common habitat.

Description

Viola palustris is a 5 to 22 cm, glabrous herb with petioles and peduncles from slender rhizomes. The cordate to reniform leaves are 2.5 to 3.5 cm wide with coarse, shallow, blunt teeth. Petioles are 2 to 17 cm. The white to lilac flowers are 10 to 13 mm long. Peduncles are about the same length as petioles. The lower three petals have purple lines. The lateral pair are lightly bearded.

It is used as the foodplant for the pearl-bordered fritillary and the small pearl-bordered fritillary. It is a known host for the pathogenic fungi Hendersonia violae and Puccinia fergussonii.

References

External links

Jepson Manual Treatment

palustris
Flora of Europe
Flora of Finland
Flora of Russia
Flora of California
Flora of Oregon
Flora of the West Coast of the United States
Plants described in 1753
Taxa named by Carl Linnaeus